The 1989 New Orleans Saints season was the franchise's 23rd season in the National Football League, and their fourteenth with home games at the Superdome. They failed to improve upon their 10–6 record from 1988 and instead finished at 9–7, missing the playoffs for the second straight season.

Offseason

NFL Draft

Personnel

Staff

Roster

Regular season

Schedule

Game summaries

Week 1

Week 6

Standings

Awards and records 
 Dalton Hilliard, NFL Leader, Touchdowns, 19 TD's

Milestones 
 Dalton Hilliard, 1st 1,000 yard rushing season (1,262 yards)

References

External links 
 Saints on Pro Football Reference
 Saints on jt-sw.com

New Orleans
New Orleans Saints seasons
New